Moqueca ( or  depending on the dialect, also spelled muqueca) is a Brazilian seafood stew. Moqueca is typically made with shrimp or fish as a base with tomatoes, onions, garlic, lime and coriander. The name moqueca comes from the term mu'keka in Kimbundu language (Angola dialect). Moqueca is often served with banana da terra (plantains) stewed in the same manner as the fish, pirão (porridge made from cassava flour), and white rice, each in its own clay pan.

Moqueca capixaba

Moqueca capixaba is native to the state of Espírito Santo. It is a combination of Brazilian and Portuguese cuisine. It is considered a softer and lighter version of moqueca. Lighter oils, such as extra-virgin olive oil, are used instead of palm oil (as in the Bahian version). Urucum pigment is added, and it is always cooked in a traditional clay pan. Moqueca capixaba can be made with fish, shrimp, crabs, sea crab or lobsters. The full meal set includes banana da terra (plantain) stew as a side dish as well as pirão and white rice - each one in its own clay pan. The dish is usually seasoned with onion, tomatoes, coriander, and chives. It is usually accompanied by pirão, which is the paste made with cassava root flour ("farinha de mandioca") and the gravy from the stew.

The Capixaba pan 
Capixaba pans, special panellas de barro, are made with black clay and glazed with mangrove tree sap. After being shaped and fired, sap is re-applied. This blackens the clay and makes it water resistant. The pan must be seasoned with oil a couple of times before use.

These cassole pans are very important to Vitória, and the city is home to a grassroots organization of pan-makers known as Associacao Das Paneleiras De Goiabeiras.

Moqueca baiana

Moqueca baiana was developed in the state of Bahia, Brazil. It was further influenced by African and Portuguese cuisines by adding dendê palm oil and coconut milk, respectively. Traditional ingredients remain the same with the dish typically garnished with chopped coriander, then served with rice and farofa.

In popular culture
 Moqueca was featured on the Netflix TV series, Street Food volume 2, which focused on Latin American street foods.

See also
 List of Brazilian dishes
 List of casserole dishes
 List of stews

References 

Brazilian stews
Casserole dishes
Tomato dishes
Shrimp dishes
Fish stews